The white-tailed hawk (Geranoaetus albicaudatus) is a large bird of prey species found in tropical and subtropical environments of the Americas.

Description
The white-tailed hawk is a large, stocky hawk. It is close in size to the Swainson's (Buteo swainsoni) and red-tailed hawks (Buteo jamaicensis), its mean measurements falling slightly ahead of the first, and slightly behind the latter. Adult birds are grey above and white below and on the rump, with faint pale grey or rufous barring. The short tail is white with a narrow black band near the end that is conspicuous in flight. A rusty-red shoulder patch is just as characteristic when the bird is sitting with wings closed. The wings are dark above, admixed with grey near the bases of the blackish primary remiges. The underwing is whitish, with indistinct brownish barring on the underwing coverts that extends onto the flanks and thighs. The iris is hazel, the cere is pale green, the beak is black with a horn-colored base, and the feet are yellow with black talons.

Immature birds are somewhat darker than adults; they may appear nearly black in faint light, in particular individuals which have little white below. The wing lining is conspicuously spotted black-and-white; the rusty shoulder patch is absent in younger birds. The tail changes from brown with several dark bars to greyish with a hazy dark band as the birds approach maturity. The bare parts are colored much like in the adult.

In the Southern Hemisphere winter, young birds are sometimes mistaken for migrant red-backed hawks (Geranoaetus polyosoma).

Call

Its call is a high-pitched cackling ke ke ke..., with a tinkling quality that reminds some of the bleating of a goat or the call of the laughing gull.

Subspecies

Three subspecies are known:

 Geranoaetus albicaudatus hypospodius – coastal Texas and the Rio Grande Valley through Middle America to northern Colombia and western Venezuela.
Intermediate in size and coloration. No dark morph.
 Geranoaetus albicaudatus colonus – Eastern Colombia to Suriname south to the mouth of the Amazon River, extending into the Caribbean.
Small and pale. Dark morph is ashy grey all over, except for the tail and underwing coverts; sometimes extensively marked rufous on the underside. Dark-morph immatures are sometimes black all over, except for the tail.
 Geranoaetus albicaudatus albicaudatus – Southern Amazon rainforest to central Argentina
Large and dark; throat usually black (except in western Argentina). The dark morph appears blackish above, blackish-brown below.

Distribution and ecology

The white-tailed hawk can be found anywhere from coastal Texas and the Rio Grande Valley to central Argentina, as well as many Caribbean islands of the Lesser Antilles, and Trinidad and Tobago. For habitat it prefers open or semi-open regions up to 2,000 ft (c. 600 m) ASL, with few trees to hinder its flight. It is not a migratory bird, though some populations may make regional movements when food is scarce. It likes to perch on bushes, trees, telephone poles or even stand around on the ground, as well as to soar. Generally, it prefers arid habitat and rarely occurs in very rainy locales.

Though it will disappear from unsuitable locations after habitat fragmentation, it has a wide range and is not considered to be a globally threatened species by the IUCN.

Its preferred hunting technique is to hover and observe the surroundings for signs of potential prey, gliding to another place when nothing is found. The diet of the white-tailed hawk varies with its environment. Rabbits make up the majority of the hawk's diet in southern Texas, while lizards of 12 in (30 cm) in length and more are the preferred prey in the Dutch West Indies. Other animals such as cotton rats, snakes, frogs, arthropods (especially grasshoppers, cicadas and beetles), and smallish birds such as passerines or quails are also eaten; it will snatch chickens when no other source of food is available. In the open cerrado of Brazil, mixed-species feeding flocks will react to a white-tailed hawk with almost as much alarm as they do when seeing such dedicated predators of birds as the aplomado falcon. The white-tailed hawk is also known to feed on carrion and to gather with other birds at brushfires to catch small animals fleeing the flames. In the tropics, white-tailed hawks rank amongst the main predators of the small monkeys known as marmosets.

Breeding pairs of white-tailed hawks build nests out of freshly broken twigs, often of thorny plants, 5–15 ft (1.5–5 m) or more above the ground on top of a tree or yucca, preferably one growing in an elevated location giving good visibility from the nest. The nest's interior is cushioned it with dried grasses and other fine materials; green twigs of mesquite or other aromatic plants are often placed in the nest too, perhaps to deter parasites. Like many Accipitridae, white-tailed hawks do not like to abandon a nest site, and nests built up over the years can thus reach sizes of up to three feet (1 m) across. The eggs are white, often lightly spotted with brown or lavender; between one and three (usually two) are laid per clutch. When approached on the nest, the adults will get airborne and observe the intruder from above, unlike related hawks, which usually wait much longer to flush and then launch a determined attack.

Footnotes

References
 eNature (2007): White-tailed Hawk. Retrieved 2008-NOV-19.
 Faria, Christiana M.A.; Rodrigues, Marcos; do Amaral, Frederico Q.; Módena, Érica & Fernandes, Alexandre M. (2006): Aves de um fragmento de Mata Atlântica no alto Rio Doce, Minas Gerais: colonização e extinção [The birds of an Atlantic Forest fragment at upper Rio Doce valley, Minas Gerais, southeastern Brazil: colonization and extinction]. Revista Brasileira de Zoologia 23(4): 1217-1230 [Portuguese with English abstract].  PDF fulltext
 Hawk Conservancy Trust (HCT) (2008): White-tailed Hawk – Buteo albicaudatus. Version of 2008-NOV-19. Retrieved 2008-NOV-19.
 Ragusa-Netto, J. (2000): Raptors and "campo-cerrado" bird mixed flock led by Cypsnagra hirundinacea (Emberizidae: Thraupinae). Revista Brasileira de Biologia 60(3): 461-467 [English with Portuguese abstract].   PDF fulltext

External links

 White-tailed hawk Information eNature.com

white-tailed hawk
white-tailed hawk
Birds of the Rio Grande valleys
Birds of Central America
Birds of South America
Birds of the Caribbean
Birds of prey of the Americas
white-tailed hawk
white-tailed hawk